Hitomi Satō may refer to:

, Japanese actress
, Japanese table tennis player